Humason is a tiny lunar impact crater located in the Oceanus Procellarum. This is a cup-shaped crater with an outer rim that rises slightly above the surrounding lunar mare. To the west is a low system of mare wrinkle ridges named the Dorsa Whiston that wind southwards towards Montes Agricola.

This crater was previously identified as Lichtenberg G before being renamed by the IAU in 1973. The crater Lichtenberg itself lies over 100 kilometers to the west.

References

External links
 LTO-38B1 Humason — L&PI topographic map of crater and vicinity.

Impact craters on the Moon